Liparistis is a genus of moths of the family Xyloryctidae.

Species
 Liparistis lioxera Meyrick, 1915
 Liparistis monosema (Lower, 1893)

References

Xyloryctidae
Xyloryctidae genera